Euproctinus is a genus of beetles in the family Carabidae, containing the following species:

 Euproctinus abjectus (Bates, 1883) 
 Euproctinus balli Shpeley, 1986 
 Euproctinus columbianus Shpeley, 1986 
 Euproctinus deliciolus (Bates, 1883) 
 Euproctinus fasciatus (Solier, 1849) 
 Euproctinus howdeni Shpeley, 1986 
 Euproctinus nigrotibialis Shpeley, 1986 
 Euproctinus ornatellus (Bates, 1883) 
 Euproctinus pallidus Shpeley, 1986 
 Euproctinus panamensis Shpeley, 1986 
 Euproctinus putzeysi (Chaudoir, 1872) 
 Euproctinus quadriplagiatus (Reiche, 1842) 
 Euproctinus quadrivittis (Chaudoir, 1872) 
 Euproctinus sigillatus (Bates, 1883) 
 Euproctinus subdeletus (Bates, 1883) 
 Euproctinus trivittatus (Leconte, 1878)

References

Lebiinae